The Union  River is a stream in the U.S. state of Washington. It originates in central Kitsap Peninsula and flows south, emptying into the end of Hood Canal. The Union River Reservoir provides drinking water for the nearby city of Bremerton.

Course
The Union River originates in central Kitsap Peninsula a few miles west of Bremerton, east of Green Mountain and northeast of Gold Mountain. It flows south and slightly west. The river is impounded in its upper course by Casad Dam, creating the Union River Reservoir. Shortly downstream from the reservoir the river plunges over McKenna Falls. The East Fork Union River joins the main stem, below which the Old Belfair Highway runs through the river valley, paralleling the Union River.

See also
 List of rivers of Washington

References

Rivers of Washington (state)
Rivers of Kitsap County, Washington
Rivers of Mason County, Washington